Jonathan W. Cuneo (born September 10, 1952) is an American lawyer who has represented clients in state and federal litigation and in government relations in the fields of antitrust, civil and human rights, consumer protection, corporate governance and securities for over three decades.

He is a partner of the law firm Cuneo Gilbert & LaDuca, LLP, a government servant, an affiliate of national legal oversight institutions, and a contributor to many legal publications. He has received the highest Martindale-Hubbell Peer Review Rating of AV.

Early life and education
Cuneo is the son of Margaret Watson Cuneo, a member of the British Intelligence in World War II, and Ernest Cuneo, a lawyer, newspaperman, former National Football League player and aide to Fiorello LaGuardia. Ernest Cuneo also served as an intelligence liaison between Office of Strategic Services chief William Donovan and Sir William Stephenson, who headed British Intelligence.

Cuneo earned a Bachelor of Arts degree from Columbia University and his Juris Doctor from Cornell Law School, Cuneo clerked for Judge Edward Tamm of the U.S. Court of Appeals for the District of Columbia Circuit until 1978.

Career 
After completing his clerkship, he worked as an attorney in the Office of the General Counsel of the Federal Trade Commission until 1981.

Government service

1981–1986
Subsequent to his tenure at the FTC, Cuneo served as assistant counsel and then counsel to the Subcommittee on Monopolies and Commercial Law of the United States House Committee on the Judiciary. There, Cuneo counseled Congressman and Committee Chairman Peter W. Rodino regarding many antitrust issues. He also assisted in the Committee's consideration of potential budget-balancing amendments to the United States Constitution in 1982. He conducted a large-scale committee investigation and successfully advocated for oversight of the insurance industry.

1986–present
Since 1986, Cuneo has served as General Counsel and Legislative Representative to the Committee to Support Antitrust Laws ("COSAL"). He also co-founded the National Association of Securities and Commercial Law Attorneys ("NASCAT")  in 1988, and served as its general counsel from 1988 until 2004.

Litigation

Joe Camel Case
Cuneo served as Washington counsel in the first case to challenge the Joe Camel cigarette advertising campaign. The action was filed in California state court in 1991 well before the U.S. Attorney General began tobacco litigation. This litigation led to the release of documents that revealed R.J. Reynolds Tobacco Company had studied under-aged smokers with a view toward selling cigarettes and consequently induced youths to start smoking through targeted advertising. Congressman Henry Waxman called Cuneo and his colleagues "American Heroes" for their release of these documents.

Enron
Cuneo served as Washington counsel on behalf of defrauded investors in Enron from 2002 through 2008. This Enron Securities Litigation recovered over $7 billion, the largest in the history of federal securities litigation.

Hungarian Gold Train
Cuneo's firm, Cuneo Gilbert & LaDuca, LLP, successfully represented Hungarian Holocaust Survivors seeking restitution and an accounting against the United States government in the Hungarian Gold Train case, which was settled for $25.5 million in 2005 after nearly five years of litigation. The settlement's terms also included an apology from the Bush Administration for the conduct of the U.S. Army.

Metromail 
Cuneo's firm brought a path-breaking class action suit against Metromail for privacy violations surrounding supermarket questionnaires. After a woman in Ohio received a sexually suggestive letter from a maximum security inmate in Texas, it came to light that the company had subcontracted for Texas prisoners to "key" the questionnaire information. Cuneo's firm settled the case for significant injunctive relief, and a cash pool of $15 million was made available to victims.

Prudential 
Cuneo's firm represented individual claimants against Prudential Insurance Company in post-settlement proceedings after a class action charging that Prudential had abused policyholders through deceptive sales practices. Over a period of eighteen months, his firm oversaw approximately 55,000 arbitration-like proceeding in this $4 billion settlement.

Controversy
Working for the plaintiff's securities bar, Cuneo was the lead lobbyist opposing passage of the Private Securities Litigation Reform Act in 1995. Although the coalition Cuneo led was unsuccessful in preventing passage of the bill, some of its more extreme provisions were defeated as the Supreme Court recently recognized in Amgen v. Connecticut Retirement Plans and Trust Funds, (February 26, 2013). After President Bill Clinton vetoed the bill in December 1995, Congress overruled that veto, the only veto override of the Clinton Presidency.

Authorship
Cuneo has authored numerous pieces in newspapers and professional journals, including The New York Times, Yale Human Rights & Development Law Journal, Georgetown Law Journal, The George Washington Law Review, The Nation, and the Legal Times. He is the co-editor of The International Handbook on Private Enforcement of Competition Law, published in the U.S. in January 2011.

Personal life
Cuneo is married to Mara Liasson, the national political reporter for NPR and political contributor to Fox News. He boxed recreationally for fifteen years and is a former collegiate and club competitive heavyweight oarsman and club rugby player.

Awards and achievements
Cuneo is listed in the Marquis Who's Who in American Law.

The American Antitrust Institute awarded Cuneo the Alfred E. Kahn Award for Antitrust Achievement, previously awarded to distinguished individuals Joel Klein, Robert Pitofsky, Frederic M. Scherer, Mario Monti, and Donald I. Baker. The AAI lauded his efforts to defend the antitrust laws even when there existed immense external pressure to weaken them in the 1980s, stating, "Mr. Cuneo was the only person outside of the government to be a spokesperson, clearinghouse, and advocate for strong antitrust enforcement.".

Cuneo was selected by the Trial Lawyers for Public Justice as a finalist for its 2006 Trial Lawyer of the Year award.

Cuneo was elected as a member of the American Law Institute in 2021.

Cuneo has been named a Fellow of the Litigation Counsel of America.

Cuneo is a former Member of the Board of Advisors of George Washington University Law School.

Cuneo has served on numerous non-profit boards, including the Appleseed Foundation, the American Antitrust Institute, the Violence Policy Center, Fighters Institute for Support and Training and the Juvenile Law Center.

See also

 Joe Camel Case
 House Committee on the Judiciary

References

External links
 ; Cuneo's Statement at the Hearing before the Committee on Energy and Natural Resources.
 Cuneo quote from PR Newswire Association LLC regarding Opportunity for Hungarian Jews to Identify Heirlooms Stolen by Nazis during WWII (11/20/99).
 Cuneo quoted in Net Developer's Journal Article, "As Americans Prepare for 'Tax Day,' Citizens Seek to Stop IRS From Collecting an Illegal Excise Tax" (4/11/06).
 Cuneo quoted in New Mexico Independent regarding "Class-action lawsuit filed in NM’s investment losses" (1/12/10).
 Jonathan Cuneo quoted in Corporate Crime Reporter regarding Amerivert v. FINRA lawsuit filed August 10, 2009 (9/17/2009).
 Jonathan W. Cuneo's profile on the Cuneo Gilbert & LaDuca website

Columbia University alumni
Cornell Law School alumni
New York (state) lawyers
Lawyers from Washington, D.C.
1952 births
Living people